Erika Lechner (sometimes listed as Erica Lechner, born 28 May 1947 in Bolzano) is an Italian luger who competed during the late 1960s and early 1970s. At the 1968 Winter Olympics in Grenoble, she originally finished third in the women's singles event behind Ortrun Enderlein and Anna-Maria Müller (both from East Germany), but was awarded the gold medal upon the disqualifications of Enderlein, Müller, and Angela Knösel (who finished fourth) when the East Germans were discovered to have their runners being illegally heated.

Biography
Lechner also won the silver medal in the women's singles event at the 1971 FIL World Luge Championships in Olang, Italy. She also won the gold medal in the women's singles event at the 1971 FIL European Luge Championships in Imst, Austria.

References

 
 
Wallenchinsky, David. (1984). "Luge: Women's Singles". In The Complete Book the Olympics: 1896-1980. New York: Penguin Books. p. 577.

External links
 
 

1947 births
Sportspeople from Bolzano
Italian female lugers
Living people
Lugers at the 1968 Winter Olympics
Lugers at the 1972 Winter Olympics
Olympic lugers of Italy
Olympic medalists in luge
Medalists at the 1968 Winter Olympics
Olympic gold medalists for Italy